Urban Angel is a Canadian television drama series, which aired on CBC Television from 1991 to 1993. Based on the memoirs of real-life Canadian journalist Victor Malarek, the show starred Louis Ferreira (credited as Justin Louis) as Victor Torres, a crusading journalist for the Montreal Tribune.

Although the series was made by the same production firm behind the 1988 film Malarek, for the purposes of the television series they chose to create a fictionalized character rather than portraying the real-life Malarek, both to give them more leeway to write original stories not derived from Malarek's book and because they had selected Ferreira, who is of Portuguese descent and could not believably have portrayed a character with a Ukrainian surname, as the lead actor.

The series aired in the United States as part of CBS's late-night Crimetime After Primetime line up.

The show's cast also included Paula de Vasconcelos, Vittorio Rossi, Dorothée Berryman, Vlasta Vrána, Arthur Grosser, Ellen David, Dean Marshall, Michael Rudder, Macha Grenon and Sophie Lorain.

References

External links

CBC Television original programming
1991 Canadian television series debuts
1993 Canadian television series endings
Television shows set in Montreal
Television series about journalism
CBS original programming
English-language television shows
1990s Canadian drama television series